In ancient Egyptian religion, a menat was a type of artefact closely associated with the goddess Hathor.

Operation
The menat was held in the hand by its counterpoise and used as a rattle by Hathor's priestesses. It was also worn as a protective amulet, particularly by Apis bulls.

Parts
The menat typically included an aegis attached to beaded strings. The other ends of the strings were tied to a counterweight that dangled on the wearer's back. The aegis was often made of faience, but other materials such as leather and bronze were also used. It was often inscribed or bore depictions of deities associated with Hathor.

Purpose
The necklace was meant to ensure good luck and fortune and to protect against evil spirits. It was also worn for protection in the afterlife and is often found buried with the dead, given as a grave gift since Ramesside times . It was expected to foster fruitfulness and good health for women, and for men it signified virility.

Footnotes

References
Robert A. Armour, Gods and Myths of Ancient Egypt, American Univ. in Cairo Press 2001
George Hart, The Routledge Dictionary Of Egyptian Gods And Goddesses, Routledge 2005
Manfres Lurker, Lexikon der Götter und Symbole der alten Ägypter, Scherz 1974
Robert Steven Bianchi, Daily Life of the Nubians, Greenwood Press 2004
Wendy Doniger, Merriam-Webster's Encyclopedia of World Religions,  Merriam-Webster 1999
Karel van der Toorn, Pieter Willem van der Horst, Bob Becking, Wm. B. Eerdmans, Dictionary of Deities and Demons in the Bible, Wm. B. Eerdmans Publishing 1999
Erman, Johann Peter Adolf, and Hermann Grapow, eds. 1926–1953. Wörterbuch der aegyptischen Sprache im Auftrage der deutschen Akademien. 6 vols. Leipzig: J. C. Hinrichs’schen Buchhandlungen. (Reprinted Berlin: Akademie-Verlag GmbH, 1971).

External links

Egyptian artefact types
Hathor
Egyptian amulets